Steropanus is a genus of beetles in the family Carabidae, containing the following species:

 Steropanus chinensis Jedlicka, 1962
 Steropanus forticornis Fairmaire, 1888
 Steropanus infissus Andrewes, 1937
 Steropanus mengtzei Jedlicka, 1931

References

Pterostichinae